Circus Renz is a 1927 German silent adventure film directed by Wolfgang Neff and starring Angelo Ferrari, Mary Kid, and Ernst Winar.

The film's sets were designed by the art director Willi Herrmann.

Cast
Angelo Ferrari
Mary Kid
Ernst Winar

See also
Circus Renz (1943 film)
Circus Renz, German circus company

References

External links

Films of the Weimar Republic
German silent feature films
German black-and-white films
Films directed by Wolfgang Neff
Circus films